The Tattersall's Cup Handicap is a Tattersall's Racing Club Group 3 open handicap race for Thoroughbred horses run over a distance of 2,400 metres at Eagle Farm Racecourse, Queensland in June. Total prizemoney is  A$200,000.

History

The inaugural running of the race was in 1924 when Serelot won.
During World War II the Tattersall's Race club held the race at Albion Park Racecourse, the only functioning racecourse in Brisbane at the time.
The 1987 winner, the New Zealand bred gelding Kensei went on later in the year to win the Melbourne Cup, as did 2019 winner Vow And Declare.
Between 1985 and 1987 the race was known as the Castlemaine Gold Cup.

Grade
1924–1979 - Principal Race
1980 onwards - Group 3

Venue
1924–1941 - Ascot Racecourse
1943–1945 - Albion Park Racecourse
1946–2014 - Eagle Farm Racecourse
2015 - Gold Coast Racecourse
2016 - Eagle Farm Racecourse
2017–2018 - Doomben Racecourse
2019 onwards - Eagle Farm Racecourse

Distance

1924–1941 -  miles
1943–1945 - 1 mile 57 yards
1946–1972 -  miles
1973 – 2200 metres
1974 – 2225 metres
1975–1976 – 2200 metres
1977 – 2212 metres
1978–1982 – 2200 metres
1983 – 2270 metres
1984 – 2244 metres
1985–1986 – 2225 metres
1987 – 2236 metres
1988 – 2232 metres
1989 – 2236 metres
1990 – 2200 metres
1991 – 2225 metres
1992–1993 – 2200 metres 
1994 – 2212 metres
1995 – 2200 metres
1996 – 2225 metres
1997 – 2200 metres
1998 – 2225 metres
1999–2001 – 2200 metres
2002 – 2206 metres
2003 – 2200 metres
2004 – 2240 metres
2005 – 2236 metres
2006–2014 - 2200 metres
2015 - 2400 metres
2016–2018 - 2200 metres
2019 - 3000 metres
2020 onwards - 2400 metres

Winners

2022 - London Banker
2021 - Incentivise
2020 - Brimham Rocks
2019 - Vow And Declare
2018 - Divine Unicorn
2017 - Rudy
2016 - Index Linked
2015 - Escado
2014 - The Inventor
2013 - Rialya
2012 - Ginga Dude
2011 - Ironstein
2010 - Mirrasalo
2009 - Hume
2008 - Ballack
2007 - Ice Chariot
2006 - Ring Of Fire
2005 - Sky Love
2004 - Acetate
2003 - Belus
2002 - Captain Test
2001 - Spirit Of Westbury
2000 - Brave Prince
1999 - Reputed Groom
1998 - Luther
1997 - Sapio
1996 - Sonata
1995 - Czar Oak
1994 - Oompala
1993 - Ancient Ritual
1992 - Donegal Mist
1991 - Greenback
1990 - Eye Of The Sky
1989 - Jondolar
1988 - Plume D'Or Veille
1987 - Kensei
1986 - Dinky Flyer
1985 - Rushcutter
1984 - Rock Show
1983 - Prince Majestic
1982 - Coe
1981 - El Laurena
1980 - Golden Rhapsody
1979 - Big Skipper
1978 - Future Shock
1977 - Wolf City
1976 - Authentic Heir
1975 - Purple Patch
1974 - Gay Master
1973 - The Developer
1972 - Buon Giorno
1971 - Planet Kingdom
1970 - Gypsy Moss
1969 - Bright Shadow
1968 - Swift Peter
1967 - Winfreux
1966 - Winfreux
1965 - Ampass
1964 - Pharmacy
1963 - River Seine
1962 - Dhaulagiri
1961 - High Society
1960 - Dow Street
1959 - Earlwood
1958 - Cool Gent
1957 - Cool Gent
1956 - Cambridge
1955 - Milwaukee
1954 - Euphrates
1953 - Callide River
1952 - Gay Felt
1951 - Rinkeno
1950 - Highway
1949 - Battle Abbey
1948 - Rio Fe
1947 - Bon Vite
1946 - Noble Hero
1945 - Repshot
1944 - Bahford
1943 - Wiseland  
1942 - race not held
1941 - Abspear
1940 - Millie's Hope
1939 - Seven Fifty
1938 - Hastate
1937 - Brownfelt
1936 - Spear Prince
1935 - Regal Star
1934 - Brown Force
1933 - Herolage
1932 - Lough Neagh
1931 - Lady Linden
1930 - race not held
1929 - Moorelin
1928 - Marella
1927 - Nonchalance
1926 - Strongbow
1925 - Lady Shepherd
1924 - Serelot

See also
 List of Australian Group races
 Group races

References

External links
 Tattersalls Club (Brisbane)

Horse races in Australia